Donsol is a 2006 Filipino indie drama film written and directed by Adolfo Alix, Jr. about a romance made in the town of Donsol. Starring Sid Lucero and Angel Aquino, the film was produced by Bicycle Pictures.

The film was shot entirely in Donsol, Sorsogon and there are underwater shots of the star of the movie the butanding. It tackled major issues like illegal fishing that poses threats to the butanding.

The film was the Philippines' official submission to the OSCARS Foreign Language Film category in 2007.

Plot
A whaleshark guide named Daniel (Sid Lucero) falls in love with the beautiful but mysterious tourist Teresa (Angel Aquino). The two individuals are nursing their own heartaches but find themselves hopelessly drawn to each other; Daniel was left behind by his girlfriend for a rich man, Teresa a widowed breast cancer patient.

Fidel (Bembol Roco), Daniel's father, is an illegal fisherman and was caught by the police coast guard. This created friction between the relationship of Daniel and the kapitana of the town who provided jobs for them as a Butanding Interaction Officer or BIO.

Cast
Sid Lucero as Daniel
Angel Aquino as Teresa
Cherie Gil as Mars
Jacklyn Jose as Ligaya
Bembol Roco as Fidel
Kenneth Ocampo as Nog
Mark Gil as Dustin
Aaron Junatas as Daniel's younger brother

Accolades

See also
Donsol, Sorsogon

References
Click the City website
The Internet Movie Database

External links

2006 films
Films set in Sorsogon
Films shot in Sorsogon
Philippine independent films
Philippine romantic drama films
Star Cinema drama films
Star Cinema films
Films directed by Adolfo Alix Jr.